Christ Carrying the Cross is a painting attributed to a follower of Hieronymus Bosch. It was painted in the early 16th century, presumably between 1500 and 1535. The work is housed in the Museum of Fine Arts in Ghent, Belgium. The painting is notable for its use of caricature to provide grotesque-looking faces surrounding Jesus.

History
The work was bought by the Museum of Fine Arts, Ghent in 1902, and was restored in 1956–1957. As for all Bosch related works, the dating is uncertain, although most art historians assigned it to his late career. The catalogue of the Bosch exhibition held in Rotterdam in 2001 assigned it 1510–1535, attributing the execution to an imitator. According to one of the authors, Bernard Vermet, that it is not as typical for Bosch is generally accepted and he finds it hard to believe that it was painted by the same painter as the Christ Crowned with Thorns in the National Gallery in London. Moreover, the colours remind him of the Mannerists of the 1530s and he relates the work to the Triptych of the Passion in Valencia and the Christ Before Pilate in Princeton, works that were definitely painted after the death of Bosch. Since then the rejection has been accepted by Stephan Fischer and disputed by Fritz Koreny. In October 2015 the Bosch Research and Conservation Project, that is doing technical research on most of Bosch's paintings since 2007, confirmed they reject the attribution to Bosch as well and consider it to be made by a follower.

Description

The work depicts Jesus carrying the cross above a dark background, surrounded by numerous heads, most of which are characterized with grotesque features. There are a total of eighteen portraits, plus one on Veronica's veil. Jesus has a woeful expression, His eyes are closed and the head is reclinating.

In the bottom right corner is the impenitent thief, who sneers against three men who are mocking him. The penitent thief is at top right: he is portrayed with very pale skin, while being confessed by a horribly ugly monk.

The bottom left corner shows Veronica with the Veil of Veronica, with her eyes half-open and the face looking back. Finally, at the top left is Simon of Cyrene, his face upside upturned.

Related works
There are two further versions of the subject by Bosch: a previous one from around 1498, now at the Royal Palace of Madrid, and another in the Kunsthistorisches Museum of Vienna from around 1500.

References

Sources

External links
 

1516 paintings
Paintings in the collection of the Museum of Fine Arts, Ghent
Paintings by Hieronymus Bosch
Bosch
Caricature